Desmia ufeus is a moth in the family Crambidae. It was described by Pieter Cramer in 1777. It is found in Suriname, French Guiana, Costa Rica, Mexico, the Dominican Republic, Puerto Rico, Jamaica, Cuba and Florida.

The wingspan is about 23 mm. Adults are on wing year round.

References

Moths described in 1777
Desmia
Moths of North America
Moths of South America